Scranton station could refer to three train stations in Scranton, Pennsylvania:
 Scranton station (NJ Transit), a proposed station
 Scranton station (Central Railroad of New Jersey)
 Radisson Lackawanna Station Hotel, the former Delaware, Lackawanna, and Western Railroad station